Kinosternon pojoaque is an extinct turtle in the genus Kinosternon. It existed in what is now New Mexico, United States, during the Middle Miocene period. It was described by Jason R. Bourque in 2012.

The type specimen was originally discovered by Galusha and Blick in the Pojoaque Member of the Tesuque Formation.

References

pojoaque
Extinct turtles
Miocene turtles
Miocene reptiles of North America
Miocene United States
Neogene geology of New Mexico
Paleontology in New Mexico
Fossils of the United States
Fossil taxa described in 2012
†